Mallapuram and similar can mean these places in India:
Mallapuram, a village in Tamil Nadu
Malappuram, a city in Kerala
Malappuram district in Kerala
Mallapur, a suburb of Hyderabad, Andhra Pradesh
B. Mallapuram, another name for Bommidi, a town in Dharmapuri district in Tamil Nadu
Gudur, Kurnool, a village in Andhra Pradesh